The 1986 World Lacrosse Championship was the fifth World Lacrosse Championship and was played in Toronto, Canada from July 18-25, 1986. The United States defeated Canada 18-9 in the final to win the tournament.

Results

Standings

Third Place
Australia 22, England 6

Final
United States 18, Canada 9

References

1986
1986
World Lacrosse Championship
International lacrosse competitions hosted by Canada
International sports competitions in Toronto